The 1964–65 season was Stoke City's 58th season in the Football League and the 34th in the First Division.

Stoke's main aim for the 1964–65 season was to consolidate themselves in the First Division and despite having not the greatest run of results Stoke finished in a comfortable position of 11th. Stanley Matthews called time on his long and famous career on 6 February 1965 against Fulham at the age of 50 and 5 days.

Season review

League
Manager Tony Waddington continued to improve the squad prior to the start of 1964–65 season with experienced players. This policy found favour with the fans and although there were those who did not like the club's veteran image, the quality of an attack that included Peter Dobing, Dennis Viollet and Jimmy McIlroy was there for all too see, and local prospects flourished alongside this impressive forward line. One of whom was John Ritchie who was top scorer in 1964–65 with 25 league goals including four against Sheffield Wednesday who would sign Ritchie in 1966.

On 6 February 1965 Stanley Matthews again entered the record books when at the age of 50 years and five days he turned out for Stoke one last time against Fulham, Stoke won the match 3–1. To say thank you to Matthews, Stoke arranged a match against a team of international star players which was broadcast live to an estimated worldwide audience of 112 million.

More veterans arrived at Stoke during the season with the arrivals of Maurice Setters, Roy Vernon and Harry Burrows helping Stoke to finish in 11th position, winning and losing 16 matches.

FA Cup
After an impressive 4–1 win against Blackpool Stoke drew 0–0 with Manchester United before losing 1–0 at a foggy Old Trafford.

League Cup
Stoke, last season's runners-up, had a poor League Cup campaign this season as they needed a replay to beat Shrewsbury Town, then edged past Southend United before losing 3–1 away at Plymouth Argyle in a replay.

Final league table

Results

Stoke's score comes first

Legend

Football League First Division

FA Cup

League Cup

Friendlies

Squad statistics

References

Stoke City F.C. seasons
Stoke